In the mathematical theory of probability, Blumenthal's zero–one law, named after Robert McCallum Blumenthal, is a statement about the nature of the beginnings of right continuous Feller process. Loosely, it states that any right continuous Feller process on  starting from deterministic point has also deterministic initial movement.

Statement 
Suppose that  is an adapted right continuous Feller process on a probability space  such that  is constant with probability one. Let . Then any event in the germ sigma algebra   has either  or

Generalization 
Suppose that  is an adapted  stochastic process on a probability space  such that  is constant with probability one. If  has Markov property with respect to the filtration  then any event   has either  or  Note that every right continuous Feller process on a probability space   has strong Markov property with respect to the filtration .

References 

Probability theory